John Waite may refer to:
John Waite (born 1952), English singer
John Waite (cricketer) (1930–2011), South African cricketer
John Waite (broadcaster) (born 1951), presenter on British radio and television
John Waite (footballer) (1942–2016), English footballer
Sir John Douglas Waite, Lord Justice of Appeal

See also
John Whaite (born 1989), English baker
John T. Wait (1811-1899), American politician